Basheer Saeed (born 28 June 1981) is a professional footballer who has represented the United Arab Emirates internationally. He also plays as a center defender .

International goals

External links
Player profile - 3nabi.com

1981 births
Living people
Emirati footballers
United Arab Emirates international footballers
Al Wahda FC players
Al Ahli Club (Dubai) players
Al Jazira Club players
Al Urooba Club players
2004 AFC Asian Cup players
UAE First Division League players
UAE Pro League players
2007 AFC Asian Cup players
Association football defenders